Elevenstring may refer to:

 The eleven-string alto guitar
 A fictional musical instrument in The Hydrogen Sonata by Iain M. Banks